Gol Makan-e Qeshlaq (also Romanized as Gol Makān-e Qeshlāq; also known as Gol Makān, Gol Makān-e Bālā, Gol Makān-e ‘Olyā, and Gol Makūn-e Avraj) is a village in Abarj Rural District, Dorudzan District, Marvdasht County, Fars Province, Iran. At the 2006 census, its population was 1,163, in 257 families.

References 

Populated places in Marvdasht County